Rosemary Lassig  (10 August 1941 – 1 November 2017), known after marriage as Rosemary Lluka, was an Australian breaststroke swimmer of the 1960s, who won a silver medal in the 4×100-metre medley relay at the 1960 Summer Olympics in Rome.  Lassig combined with Dawn Fraser, Jan Andrew and Marilyn Wilson to register a silver medal in the 4×100-metre medley relay five seconds behind the winners, the United States.  In her only individual event, the 200-metre breaststroke, she did not advance beyond the preliminary heats.

Lassig, who was born in Bundaberg, Queensland, died in Sydney on 1 November 2017 due to complications caused by Alzheimer's disease.

See also
 List of Olympic medalists in swimming (women)

References

 

1941 births
2017 deaths
Swimmers at the 1960 Summer Olympics
Olympic swimmers of Australia
Medalists at the 1960 Summer Olympics
Olympic silver medalists for Australia
Olympic silver medalists in swimming
Australian female breaststroke swimmers
Sportspeople from Bundaberg
20th-century Australian women